Umberto Poli may refer to:

 Umberto Saba (1883–1957), Italian poet and novelist, born Umberto Poli
 Umberto Poli (cyclist) (born 1996), Italian cyclist